Party of the Democratic Karma is a Spanish joke party founded by the publishers of the magazine Karma dice (Karma says), a satirical publication.

Activities and history
The party's motto is "PKD: the useless vote. The vote just like you." (Spanish: "PKD: el voto inútil. El voto como tú.") They support absurd proposals like paying civil servants with corticoles (vouchers from the general store El Corte Inglés redeemable for school supplies), building in flower pots, and promising to corrupt themselves as much as possible. Their magazine and party are based in the Basque Country, and they reflect a reaction to their fellow Basque citizens' perceived overly serious approach to life.

In the Basque elections in 2001 the party received the seventh most votes.

References

2000 establishments in Spain
Joke political parties in Spain
Political parties established in 2000
Political parties in the Basque Country (autonomous community)
Organisations based in Bilbao